The Thirteen Buddhist Sites of Izumo（出雲国十三仏霊場, Izumo no kuni jūsan butsu reijō）are a group of 13 Buddhist sacred sites in Shimane Prefecture, Japan. The temples are dedicated to the Thirteen Buddhas.

Directory

See also
 Thirteen Buddhas

External links
Official website in Japanese

Buddhist temples in Saitama Prefecture
Buddhist pilgrimage sites in Japan